Thomas or Tom Blackwell may refer to:

 Thomas Blackwell (principal) (1660–1728), principal of Marischal College
 Thomas Blackwell (scholar) (1701–1757), Scottish classical scholar, son of above
 Thomas Evans Blackwell (1819–1863), English civil engineer
 Thomas Blackwell (fl. 1830), British co-founder of Crosse & Blackwell
 Tom Blackwell (1938–2020), American photorealist painter
 Thomas W. Blackwell (1958–2017), American politician

See also 
 Blackwell (surname)